Bronisław Pawlicki (28 December 1925 – 19 September 2014) was a Polish field hockey player who competed in the 1952 Summer Olympics. He was born in Zakrzewo.

He was part of the Polish field hockey team, which competed in the 1952 Olympic tournament. He played as back in the only match for Poland in the main tournament. He died on 19 September 2014, aged 88, in Gniezno.

References

External links
 
Profile, pkol.pl; accessed 27 September 2014 

1925 births
2014 deaths
Polish male field hockey players
Olympic field hockey players of Poland
Field hockey players at the 1952 Summer Olympics
People from Gniezno County
Sportspeople from Greater Poland Voivodeship